Guy Claud (born 25 April 1936) is a French former cyclist. He competed in the team pursuit at the 1960 Summer Olympics.

References

External links
 

1936 births
Living people
French male cyclists
Olympic cyclists of France
Cyclists at the 1960 Summer Olympics
People from Montrouge
French track cyclists
Sportspeople from Hauts-de-Seine
Cyclists from Île-de-France